Tor Stokke (23 August 1928 – 13 June 2003) was a Norwegian film actor. He appeared in 27 films between 1956 and 1992. He is the father of actress Linn Stokke.

Selected filmography
 1958: I slik en natt as a policeman
 1959: The Chasers
 1960: Struggle for Eagle Peak
 1961: Et øye på hver finger
 1968: Snow Treasure
 1971: Love Is War
 1988: Codename: Kyril

External links

1928 births
2003 deaths
Norwegian male film actors
Deaths from cancer in Norway